The Canadian Coronation Contingent is a guard of honour, composed of members of the Canadian Forces and Royal Canadian Mounted Police, assembled distinctly for participation in the coronation ceremonies of the Canadian monarch in London, England. Only three Coronation Contingents have ever been mounted, all of them before the unification of the Canadian Army, Royal Canadian Air Force, Royal Canadian Navy into the Canadian Forces; for the coronation of King Edward VII and Queen Alexandra in 1902, the coronation of King George VI and Queen Elizabeth in 1937, and again for the coronation of Queen Elizabeth II in 1953.

1902 coronation
The Canadian military contingent for the Coronation of Edward VII and Alexandra consisted of some 600 men and was commanded by Lieutenant-Colonel Pellatt, of The Queen's Own Rifles of Canada. The contingent, which included veterans of the Battle of Paardeberg, arrived at Liverpool on 20 June 1902, and were given an "immense reception" by local people. They camped with other Dominion and colonial troops at Alexandra Palace in north London.

1911 coronation
The Canadian contingent for the Coronation of George V and Mary was a force of 708, of which 53 were officers.

1937 Coronation
For the Coronation of George VI and Elizabeth, Canada sent a contingent of 351 representing the Navy, Air Force and Royal Canadian Mounted Police who each provided about 30 men, whith the Army providing the balance.

1953 coronation
For the Coronation of Elizabeth II, Canada sent the largest contingent of any Commonwealth realm; 180 men marched in the procession while 320 lined the route in the area near Canada House. In total, there were some 700 active members of the Canadian forces involved. Many of the participating Canadian troops were based with NATO in Germany, but horses were sent direct from Canada for the Royal Canadian Mounted Police contingent who rode with the Canadian Army, while four others formed an escort for the Prime Minister of Canada, Louis St. Laurent, and his wife.

References

See also
 Coronation of Queen Elizabeth II
 The Canadian Crown and the Canadian Forces
 King’s Guard

Monarchy in Canada
Canadian Army